The name Norman has been used for seven tropical cyclones in the eastern Pacific Ocean.
 Hurricane Norman (1978) – a Category 4 hurricane that struck California as a tropical depression.
 Hurricane Norman (1982) – a Category 2 hurricane that turned toward Baja California.
 Tropical Storm Norman (1994) – weak, short-lived tropical storm.
 Tropical Storm Norman (2000) – struck Mexico.
 Tropical Storm Norman (2006) – near southwestern Mexico.
 Tropical Storm Norman (2012) – weak and short lived, it also struck Mexico.
 Hurricane Norman (2018) – powerful Category 4 hurricane that moved into the Central Pacific.

Norman has been used for one tropical cyclone in the Southern Hemisphere:
 Cyclone Norman (2000) – no direct impact on Western Australia.

Pacific hurricane set index articles
Australian region cyclone set index articles